Sarah Corbett (born 1970) is a British poet.

She graduated with a degree in English and sociology from the University of Leeds in 1992, an MA in creative writing from the University of East Anglia in 1998, and a PhD in creative and critical writing from the University of Manchester in 2013. She has published five collections of poetry, including the verse-novel, 'And She Was' (2015) and 'A Perfect Mirror' (2018). The Red Wardrobe won an Eric Gregory Award in 1998, and was shortlisted for the T. S. Eliot Prize and Forward Prize. She is a lecturer at Lancaster University, having previously taught for the Open University.

Awards
1997 Eric Gregory Award, The Red Wardrobe

Bibliography
 The Red Wardrobe (Seren Books, 1998)
 The Witch Bag (Seren Books, 2002)
 Other Beasts (Seren Books, 2008)
'And She Was' (Pavilion Poetry/Liverpool University Press, 2015)
'A Perfect Mirror' (Pavilion Poetry/Liverpool University Press, 2018)

References

1970 births
Living people
Alumni of the University of Leeds
Alumni of the University of East Anglia
Alumni of the University of Manchester
Academics of the Open University
Academics of Lancaster University
British poets